Sharifabad-e Quzan (also Romanized as Sharīfābād-e Qūzān; also known as Sharīfābād) is a village in Haram Rud-e Olya Rural District, in the Central District of Malayer County, Hamadan Province, Iran. At the 2006 census, its population was 481, in 117 families.

References 

Populated places in Malayer County